This is a select bibliography of English-language books (including translations) and journal articles about the history of Ukraine. Book entries have references to journal reviews about them when helpful and available. Additional bibliographies can be found in many of the book-length works listed below. See the bibliography section for several additional book and chapter-length bibliographies from academic publishers and online bibliographies from historical associations and academic institutions.

Inclusion criteria
Works included below are referenced in the notes or bibliographies of scholarly secondary sources or journals. Included works should: be published by an independent academic or notable non-governmental publisher; be authored by an independent and notable subject matter expert; or have significant independent scholarly journal reviews. Works published by non-academic government entities are excluded.

This bibliography is restricted to history, and specifically excludes items such modern travelogues, guide books, or popular culture.

Citation style
This bibliography uses APA style citations. Entries do not use templates. References to reviews and notes for entries do use citation templates. Where books which are only partially related to Ukrainian history are listed, the titles for chapters or sections should be indicated if possible, meaningful, and not excessive.

If a work has been translated into English, the translator should be included and a footnote with appropriate bibliographic information for the original language version should be included.

Regarding book titles and the spelling of Kyiv and Kiev and similar words, the form used in the latest published version should be used and the version and relevant information noted if it previously was published or reviewed under a different title.

General surveys of Ukrainian history
 Magocsi, P. E., (2010). A History of Ukraine: The Land and Its Peoples. Toronto: University of Toronto Press.
 Plokhy, S. (2015). The Gates of Europe: A History of Ukraine. New York: Basic Books.
 Reid, A. (1999). Borderland. New York: Basic Books.
 Subtelny, O. (2008). Ukraine: A History (4th ed.). Toronto: University of Toronto Press.
 Szporluk, R. (1982). Ukraine: A Brief History, 2nd ed., Detroit: Ukrainian Festival Committee. 
 Wylegala, A., & Glowacka-Grajper, M. (2019). The Burden of the Past: History, Memory, and Identity in Contemporary Ukraine. Bloomington: Indiana University Press.

Surveys of Eurasian History
Works listed have substantial material and context on Ukrainian history.
 Fritz, V. (2007). State-Building: A Comparative Study of Ukraine, Lithuania, Belarus, and Russia (1st ed.). Central European University Press.
 Halperin, C. J. (2010). National Identity in Premodern Rus'. Russian History, 37(3), 275–294.

Russia

 Blum, J. (1971). Lord and Peasant in Russia from the Ninth to the Nineteenth Century. Princeton: Princeton University Press.
 Plokhy, S. (2017). Lost Kingdom: The Quest for Empire and the Making of the Russian Nation. New York: Basic Books.
 Thompson, J. M., & Ward, C. J. (2017). Russia: A Historical Introduction from Kievan Rus’ to the Present (8th edition). London, UK: Routledge.

Ukrainian studies
 Amar, T. C. (2015). The Paradox of Ukrainian Lviv: A Borderland City between Stalinists, Nazis, and Nationalists. Ithaca: Cornell University Press.
 Berezhnaya, L. (2015). A View from the Edge: Borderland Studies and Ukraine, 1991-2013. Harvard Ukrainian Studies, 34(1/4), 53–78.
 Bilenky, S. (2018). Imperial Urbanism in the Borderlands: Kyiv, 1800-1905 (Illustrated edition). Toronto: University of Toronto Press.
 Budurowycz, B. (1983). Poland and the Ukrainian Problem, 1921-1939. Canadian Slavonic Papers / Revue Canadienne Des Slavistes, 25(4), 473–500.
 Dabrowski, P. M. (2021). The Carpathians: Discovering the Highlands of Poland and Ukraine (NIU Series in Slavic, East European, and Eurasian Studies). DeKalb: Northern Illinois University Press.
 Davies, B. (2007). Warfare, State and Society on the Black Sea Steppe, 1500–1700.
 Kaminski, A. S. (1993). Republic vs. Autocracy Poland-Lithuania and Russia 1686-1697 (Harvard Series In Ukrainian Studies). Cambridge: Harvard Ukrainian Research Institute.
 Markovits, A. S., & Sysyn, F. E. (Eds.). (1982). Nationbuilding and the Politics of Nationalism: Essays on Austrian Galicia (Harvard Series In Ukrainian Studies). Cambridge: Harvard Ukrainian Research Institute.
 Rieber, A. J. (2014). The Struggle for the Eurasian Borderlands: From the Rise of Early Modern Empires to the End of the First World War. Cambridge: Cambridge University Press.
 Samokhvalov, V. (2018). Fractured Eurasian Borderlands: The Case of Ukraine. In A. Ohanyan (Ed.), Russia Abroad: Driving Regional Fracture in Post-Communist Eurasia and Beyond. Washington, D.C.: Georgetown University Press.
 Snyder, T. (2004). The Reconstruction of Nations: Poland, Ukraine, Lithuania, Belarus, 1569–1999. New Haven: Yale University Press.
 ———. (2010). Bloodlands: Europe Between Hitler and Stalin. New York: Basic Books.
 Staliūnas, D. (2007). Between Russification and Divide and Rule: Russian Nationality Policy in the Western Borderlands in mid-19th Century. Jahrbücher Für Geschichte Osteuropas, 55(3), 357–373.
 Staliūnas, D., & Aoshima, Y., (eds.). (2021). The Tsar, the Empire, and the Nation: Dilemmas of Nationalization in Russia's Western Borderlands, 1905–1915. Historical Studies in Eastern Europe and Eurasia. Budapest: Central European University Press.
 Thaden, E. (1984). Russia’s Western Borderlands, 1710-1980, Princeton, N.J.: Princeton University Press.
 Ther, P., & Kreutzmüller, C. (2014). The Dark Side of Nation-States: Ethnic Cleansing in Modern Europe. New York: Berghahn Books.
 Von, H. & Herbert J. (2011). War in a European Borderland: Occupations and Occupation Plans in Galicia and Ukraine; 1914–1918. Seattle, WA: University of Washington.

Period histories

Ukraine before the Russian empire

This section includes works on Ukrainian history before the establishment of the Russian Empire.
 Barford, P. M. (2001). The Early Slavs: Culture and Society in Early Medieval Eastern Europe (1st edition). New York: Cornell University Press.
 Curta, F. (2006). Southeastern Europe in the Middle Ages, 500–1250. Cambridge, UK: Cambridge University Press.
 Dolukhanov, P. (1996). The Early Slavs: Eastern Europe from the Initial Settlement to the Kievan Rus. London, UK: Routledge.
 Halperin, C. (2010). National Identity in Premodern Rus'. Russian History, 37(3), 275–294.
 Pelenski, J. (1979). The Sack of Kiev of 1482 in Contemporary Muscovite Chronicle Writing. Harvard Ukrainian Studies, 3/4, 638–649.
 Pelenski, J. (1983). The Emergence of the Muscovite Claims to the Byzantine-Kievan "Imperial Inheritance". Harvard Ukrainian Studies, 7, 520–531.
 Plokhy, S. (2010). The Origins of the Slavic Nations: Premodern Identities in Russia, Ukraine, and Belarus. Cambridge, UK: Cambridge University Press.
 Raffensperger, C. (2016). Ties of Kinship: Genealogy and Dynastic Marriage in Kyivan Rus´ (Harvard Series In Ukrainian Studies). Cambridge: Harvard Ukrainian Research Institute.

Ukraine during the Russian empire

This section includes works on Ukrainian history generally after the establishment of the Russian Empire until the Russian Revolution.
 Bilenky, S. (2012). Romantic Nationalism in Eastern Europe: Russian, Polish, and Ukrainian Political Imaginations. Redwood City: Stanford University Press.
 Fisher, A. W. (1970). The Russian Annexation of the Crimea, 1772–1783. Cambridge: Cambridge University Press.
 Friesen, L. (2009). Rural Revolutions in Southern Ukraine: Peasants, Nobles, and Colonists, 1774-1905 (Harvard Series In Ukrainian Studies). Cambridge: Harvard Ukrainian Research Institute.
 Heuman, S. (1998). Kistiakovsky: The Struggle for National and Constitutional Rights in the Last Years of Tsarism (Harvard Series In Ukrainian Studies). Cambridge: Harvard Ukrainian Research Institute.
 Kappeler, A. (2001). The Russian Empire: A Multiethnic History (A. Clayton, trans.). Harlow: Longman.
 Kohut, Z. E. (1989). Russian Centralism and Ukrainian Autonomy: Imperial Absorption of the Hetmanate, 1760s–1830s (Harvard Series In Ukrainian Studies). Cambridge: Harvard Ukrainian Research Institute.
 LeDonne, J. P. (1997). The Russian Empire and the World 1700–1917: The Geopolitics of Expansion and Containment, Oxford: Oxford University Press.
 O’Neill, K. (2017). Claiming Crimea: A History of Catherine the Great’s Southern Empire. New Haven: Yale University Press.
 Subtelny, O. (1980). Russia and the Ukraine: The Difference That Peter I Made. The Russian Review, 39(1), 1–17.

Ukraine during the Soviet era

This section covers Ukrainian history from 19171991.
 Boriak, H., Graziosi, A., Hajda, L. A., Kessler, G., Maksudov, S., Pianciola, N., & Grabowicz, G. G. (2009). Hunger by Design: The Great Ukrainian Famine and Its Soviet Context (H. Hryn, Ed.; Illustrated edition). Cambridge: Harvard Ukrainian Research Institute.
 Bruski, J. J., & Bałuk-Ulewiczowa, T. (2016). Between Prometheism and Realpolitik: Poland and Soviet Ukraine, 1921–1926. Krakow, Poland: Jagiellonian University Press.
 Conquest, R. (1970). The Nation Killers: The Soviet Deportation of Nationalities. New York: Macmillan.
 Conquest, R. (2006). The Harvest of Sorrow: Soviet Collectivization and the Terror-Famine. London: Pimlico.
 Hagenloh, P. (2009). Stalin's Police: Public Order and Mass Repression in the USSR, 1926–1941. Washington, D.C: Woodrow Wilson Center Press.
 Himka, J.-P. (1992). Western Ukraine between the Wars. Canadian Slavonic Papers, 34(4), 391–412.
 Khlevniuk, O. (2004). The History of the Gulag: From Collectivization to the Great Terror. New Haven, CT: Yale University Press
 Liber, G. (2010). Soviet Nationality Policy, Urban Growth, and Identity Change in the Ukrainian SSR 1923-1934 (Cambridge Russian, Soviet and Post-Soviet Studies). Cambridge: Cambridge University Press.
 Liber, G. (2016). Total Wars and the Making of Modern Ukraine, 1914-1954. Toronto: University of Toronto Press.
 Mace, J. E. (1983). Communism and the Dilemmas of National Liberation: National Communism in Soviet Ukraine, 1918-1933 (Harvard Series In Ukrainian Studies). Cambridge: Harvard Ukrainian Research Institute.
 Martin, T. (1998). The Origins of Soviet Ethnic Cleansing. The Journal of Modern History, 70(4), 813–861.
 McBride, J. (2016). Peasants into Perpetrators: The OUN-UPA and the Ethnic Cleansing of Volhynia, 1943–1944. Slavic Review, 75(3), 630–654.
 Naimark, N. M. (2012). Stalin's Genocides. Princeton: Princeton University Press.
 Pauly, M. (2014). Breaking the Tongue: Language, Education, and Power in Soviet Ukraine, 1923–1934. University of Toronto Press.
 Snyder, T. (2010). Bloodlands: Europe Between Hitler and Stalin. New York: Basic Books.
 Stachiw, M. (1969). Western Ukraine at the Turning Point of Europe's History 1918–1923. (2 vols.). New York: Shevchenko Scientific Society.
 Veryha, W. (1984). Famine in Ukraine in 1921–1923 and the Soviet Government's Countermeasures. Nationalities Papers, 12(2), 265–286.
 Von, H. & Herbert J. (2011). War in a European Borderland: Occupations and Occupation Plans in Galicia and Ukraine; 1914–1918. Seattle, WA: University of Washington.
 Wheatcroft, S. (2012). The Soviet Famine of 1946–1947, the Weather and Human Agency in Historical Perspective. Europe-Asia Studies, 64(6), 987–1005.
 Yekelchyk S. (2015). Stalin's Empire of Memory: Russian-Ukrainian Relations in the Soviet Historical Imagination.  Toronto: University of Toronto Press.

Russian Revolution and Civil War
 Abramson, H. (1999). A Prayer for the Government: Ukrainians and Jews in Revolutionary Times, 1917-1920 (Harvard Series In Ukrainian Studies). Cambridge: Ukrainian Research Institute of Harvard University.
 Adams, A. E. (1963). Bolsheviks in the Ukraine: The Second Campaign, 1918–1919. New Haven: Yale University Press.
 Applebaum, A. (2017). Chapter 1: The Ukrainian Revolution, 1917. In Red Famine: Stalin's War on Ukraine. New York: Doubleday.
 Baker, M. (1999). Beyond the National: Peasants, Power, and Revolution in Ukraine. Journal of Ukrainian Studies, 24(1), 39–67.
 Baker, M. R. (2016). Peasants, Power, and Place: Revolution in the Villages of Kharkiv Province, 1914–1921 (Harvard Series In Ukrainian Studies). Cambridge: Harvard Ukrainian Research Institute.
 Borys, J. & Armstrong, J. A. (1980). The Sovietization of Ukraine, 1917-1923: The Communist Doctrine and Practice of National Self-Determination. Edmonton, AB: Canadian Institute of Ukrainian Studies.
 Dornik, W. (Ed.). (2022). The Emergence of Ukraine: Self-Determination, Occupation, and War in Ukraine, 1917-1922. University of Alberta Press.
 Edelman, R. (1985). Rural Proletarians and Peasant Disturbances: The Right Bank Ukraine in the Revolution of 1905. The Journal of Modern History, 57(2), 248–277.
 Guthier, S. (1979). The Popular Base of Ukrainian Nationalism in 1917. Slavic Review, 38(1), 30–47.
 Hunczak, T. (1977). The Ukraine 1917–1921: A Study in Revolution. Cambridge: Harvard Ukrainian Research Institute.
 Kenez, P. (1971, 1977). Civil war in South Russia (2 vols.). Berkeley: University of California Press.
 Kuchabsʹkyĭ, V. & Fagan, G. (2009). Western Ukraine in Conflict with Poland and Bolshevism, 1918–1923. Toronto: Canadian Institute of Ukrainian Studies Press.
 Malle, S. (2009). The Economic Organization of War Communism 1918-1921 (Cambridge Russian, Soviet and Post-Soviet Studies). Cambridge: Cambridge University Press.
 Procyk, A. (1995). Russian Nationalism and Ukraine: The Nationality Policy of the Volunteer Army during the Civil War. Edmonton: Canadian Institute of Ukrainian Studies Press.
 Reshetar, J. S. (1952). The Ukrainian Revolution, 1917–1920, A Study in Nationalism. Princeton: NJ: Princeton University Press.
 Skirda, A. (2004). Nestor Makhno, Anarchy's Cossack: The Struggle for Free Soviets in the Ukraine 1917–1921. Edinburgh: AK Press.
 Velychenko, S. (2010). State Building in Revolutionary Ukraine: A Comparative Study of Government and Bureaucrats, 1917–22. Toronto: University of Toronto Press.
 Von, H. & Hunczak, T. (1977). The Ukraine, 1917-1921: A Study in Revolution. Cambridge: Harvard University Press.
 Yekelchyk, S. (2019). The Ukrainian Meanings of 1918 and 1919. Harvard Ukrainian Studies, 36(1/2), 73–86.

(ukr.) Західно-Українська Народна Республіка 1918–1923. Енциклопедія. Т. 1 [archive]: А–Ж. Івано-Франківськ : Манускрипт-Львів, 2018. 688 с. ISBN 978-966-2067-44-6

(ukr.) Західно-Українська Народна Республіка 1918–1923. Енциклопедія. Т. 2 [archive]: З–О. Івано-Франківськ : Манускрипт-Львів, 2019. 832 с. ISBN 978-966-2067-61-3

(ukr.) Західно-Українська Народна Республіка 1918-1923. Енциклопедія. Т. 3 [archive]: П - С. Івано-Франківськ: Манускрипт-Львів, 2020.576 с. ISBN 978-966-2067-65-1

(ukr.) Західно-Українська Народна Республіка 1918-1923. Енциклопедія. Т. 4 [archive]: Т - Я. Івано-Франківськ: Манускрипт-Львів, 2021.688 с. ISBN 978-966-2067-72-9

World War II and the Holocaust in Ukraine

Works listed here should have substantial information about events in Ukraine or relating to Ukrainians, not general works on World War II or the Holocaust.

 Baraban, E. V. (2014). Filming a Stalinist War Epic in Ukraine: Ihor Savchenko's "The Third Strike." Canadian Slavonic Papers / Revue Canadienne Des Slavistes, 56(1/2), 17–41.
 Bartov, O. (2008). Eastern Europe as the Site of Genocide. The Journal of Modern History, 80(3), 557–593.
 Bellezza, S. A. (2008). The Discourse over the Nationality Question in Nazi-Occupied Ukraine: The Generalbezirk Dnjepropetrowsk, 1941-3. Journal of Contemporary History, 43(4), 573–596.
 Kiebuzinski, K., & Motyl, A. (Eds.). (2017). The Great West Ukrainian Prison Massacre of 1941: A Sourcebook. Amsterdam: Amsterdam University Press.
 Markiewicz, P. (2021). Unlikely Allies: Nazi German and Ukrainian Nationalist Collaboration in the General Government During World War II. West Lafayette: Purdue University Press.
 Marples, D. R. (1985). Western Ukraine and Western Belorussia under Soviet Occupation: The Development of Socialist Farming, 1939-1941. Canadian Slavonic Papers / Revue Canadienne Des Slavistes, 27(2), 158–177.
 Snyder, T. (1999). “To Resolve the Ukrainian Problem Once and for All”: The Ethnic Cleansing of Ukrainians in Poland, 1943–1947. Journal of Cold War Studies, 1(2), 86–120.
 Snyder, T. (2003). The Causes of Ukrainian-Polish Ethnic Cleansing 1943. Past & Present, 179, 197–234.
 Snyder, T. (2003). The Ethnic Cleansing of Western Ukraine (1939–1945). In The Reconstruction of Nations: Poland, Ukraine, Lithuania, Belarus, 1569–1999 (pp. 154–178). New Haven: Yale University Press.
 Steinhart, E. C. (2015). The Holocaust and the Germanization of Ukraine. New York: Cambridge University Press.
 Ther, P., & Kreutzmüller, C. (2014). The Dark Side of Nation-States: Ethnic Cleansing in Modern Europe. New York: Berghahn Books.

Holocaust
 Berkhoff, K. C., & Carynnyk, M. (1999). The Organization of Ukrainian Nationalists and Its Attitude toward Germans and Jews: Iaroslav Stets’Ko’s 1941 Zhyttiepys. Harvard Ukrainian Studies, 23(3/4), 149–184.
 Dean, M. (1999). Collaboration in the Holocaust: Crimes of the Local Police in Belorussia and Ukraine, 1941-44. New York: Palgrave Macmillan.
 Gerhard, G. (2009). Food and Genocide: Nazi Agrarian Politics in the Occupied Territories of the Soviet Union. Contemporary European History, 18(1), 45–65.
 Goldenshteyn, M. (2022). So They Remember: A Jewish Family’s Story of Surviving the Holocaust in Soviet Ukraine. Norman: University of Oklahoma Press.
 Himka, J.-P. (2012). Ukrainian Memories of the Holocaust: The Destruction of Jews as Reflected in Memoirs Collected in 1947. Canadian Slavonic Papers / Revue Canadienne Des Slavistes, 54(3/4), 427–442.
 Himka, J.-P. (2011). The Lviv Pogrom of 1941: The Germans, Ukrainian Nationalists, and the Carnival Crowd. Canadian Slavonic Papers / Revue Canadienne Des Slavistes, 53(2/4), 209–243.
 Katchanovski, I. (2010). The Politics of Soviet and Nazi Genocides in Orange Ukraine. Europe-Asia Studies''', 62(6), 973–997.
 Lower, W. (2002). A New Ordering of Space and Race: Nazi Colonial Dreams in Zhytomyr, Ukraine, 1941-1944. German Studies Review, 25(2), 227–254.
 Lower, W. (2005). Nazi Empire-Building and the Holocaust in Ukraine. Chapel Hill: University of North Carolina Press.
 Lower, W. (2012). Axis Collaboration, Operation Barbarossa, and the Holocaust in Ukraine. In A. J. Kay, J. Rutherford, & D. Stahel (Eds.), Nazi Policy on the Eastern Front, 1941: Total War, Genocide, and Radicalization (pp. 186–219).  Woodbridge: Boydell & Brewer.
 Markiewicz, P. (2021). Unlikely Allies: Nazi German and Ukrainian Nationalist Collaboration in the General Government During World War II. West Lafayette: Purdue University Press.
 Piotrowski, T. (Ed.). (2008). Genocide and Rescue in Wolyn: Recollections of the Ukrainian Nationalist Ethnic Cleansing Campaign Against the Poles During World War II. Jefferson: McFarland & Company.
 Podol’s’kyi, A., & Lang, S. (2008). A Reluctant Look Back: Jewry and the Holocaust in Ukraine. Osteuropa, 58(8/10), 271–278.
 Snyder, T. (2003). The Causes of Ukrainian-Polish Ethnic Cleansing 1943. Past & Present, 179, 197–234.
 Steinhart, E. C. (2015). The Holocaust and the Germanization of Ukraine. Cambridge: Cambridge University Press.
 Zabarko, B. (Ed.). (2004). Holocaust in the Ukraine. London: Vallentine Mitchell.

Military history
 Buttar, P. (2018). On a Knife's Edge: The Ukraine, November 1942-March 1943. Oxford: Osprey Publishing.
 ————. (2019). Retribution: The Soviet Reconquest of Central Ukraine, 1943. Oxford: Osprey Publishing.
 ————. (2020). The Reckoning: The Defeat of Army Group South, 1944. Oxford: Osprey Publishing.
 Stahel, D. (2012). Kiev 1941: Hitler's Battle for Supremacy in the East. Cambridge: Cambridge University Press.

Independent Ukraine
This section covers Ukrainian history from 1991present.
 Aslund, A., & McFaul, M. (2006). Revolution in Orange: The Origins of Ukraine's Democratic Breakthrough. New York: Carnegie Endowment for International Peace.
 Birch, S. (2000). Elections and Democratization in Ukraine. New York: Macmillan.
 Ivan Katchanovski, Fukuyama, F., & Umland, A. (2014). Cleft Countries—Regional Political Divisions and Cultures in Post-Soviet Ukraine and Moldova. Germany: Stuttgart Ibidem.
 Kuzio, T. (2015). Contemporary Ukraine: Dynamics of Post-Soviet Transformation. London: Routledge.
 Kuzio, T. (2016). Ukraine State and Nation Building. London Routledge.

The Russo-Ukraine war

Regional studies
Black Sea
 Under construction
Crimea

 Başer, A. (2019). Conflicting Legitimacies in the Triangle of the Noghay Hordes, Crimean Khanate, and Ottoman Empire. Harvard Ukrainian Studies, 36(1/2), 105–122.
 Figes, O. (2010). Crimea. London: Metropolitan Books.
 Fisher, A. W. (1970). The Russian Annexation of the Crimea 1772–1783. Cambridge: Cambridge University Press.
 Klein, D. (2012). The Crimean Khanate between East and West. Wiesbaden: Harrassowitz Verlag.
 Kolodziejczyk, D. (2011). The Crimean Khanate and Poland-Lithuania (Annotated edition). Lieden: Brill Publishers.
 Mosse, W. E. (1963). The Rise and Fall of the Crimean System 1855–71: The Story of a Peace Settlement. New York: Macmillan.
 O’Neill, K. (2017). Claiming Crimea: A History of Catherine the Great’s Southern Empire. New Haven: Yale University Press.
 Sasse, G. (2007). The Crimea Question: Identity, Transition, and Conflict (Harvard Series In Ukrainian Studies). Cambridge: Harvard Ukrainian Research Institute.

Donbas
 Under construction

Topical histories
Arts and culture
 Blacker, U. (2022). Managing the Arts in Soviet Ukraine. Kritika: Explorations in Russian and Eurasian History, 23(2), 389-399.
 Czaplicka, J. (Ed.). (2005). Lviv: A City in the Crosscurrents of Culture (Harvard Series In Ukrainian Studies). Cambridge: Harvard Ukrainian Research Institute.
 Grabowicz, G. G. (1981). Toward a History of Ukrainian Literature (Harvard Series In Ukrainian Studies). Cambridge: Harvard Ukrainian Research Institute.
 Ilnytzkyj, O. S. (1998). Ukrainian Futurism, 1914–1930: A Historical and Critical Study (Harvard Series In Ukrainian Studies). Cambridge: Harvard Ukrainian Research Institute.
 Makaryk, I., & Tkacz, V. (2015). Modernism in Kyiv: Jubilant Experimentation. Toronto: University of Toronto Press.
 Martynowych, O. T. (2014). The Showman and the Ukrainian Cause: Folk Dance, Film, and the Life of Vasile Avramenko. Winnipeg: University of Manitoba Press.
 Natan M. M. (2006). Jews, Ukrainians, and Russians in Kiev: Intergroup Relations in Late Imperial Associational Life. Slavic Review, 65(3), 475–501.
 Shkandrij, M. (2001).  Russia and Ukraine: Literature and the Discourse of Empire from Napoleonic to Postcolonial Times. Montreal & Kingston: McGill-Queen's Press.

Customs, traditions, and folklore
 Martynowych, O. T. (2014). The Showman and the Ukrainian Cause: Folk Dance, Film, and the Life of Vasile Avramenko. Winnipeg: University of Manitoba Press.

Chernobyl

 Aleksievič, S., & Gessen, K. (2005). Voices From Chernobyl: The Oral History of a Nuclear Disaster. Chicago: Dalkey Archive Press.
 Fialkova, L. (2001). Chornobyl's Folklore: Vernacular Commentary on Nuclear Disaster. Journal of Folklore Research, 38(3), 181–204.
 Geist, E. (2015). Political Fallout: The Failure of Emergency Management at Chernobyl. Slavic Review, 74(1), 104–126.
 Gould, P. (1998). Fire in the Tain: The Democratic Consequences of Chernobyl. Baltimore, MD: Johns Hopkins University Press.
 Higginbotham, A. (2019). Midnight in Chernobyl: The Untold Story of the World's Greatest Nuclear Disaster. New York: Simon & Schuster.
 Kalmbach, K. (2013). Radiation and Borders: Chernobyl as a National and Transnational Site of Memory. Global Environment, 6(11), 130–159.
 Kapitza, S. (1993). Lessons of Chernobyl: The Cultural Causes of the Meltdown. Foreign Affairs, 72(3), 7–11.
 Marples, D. R. (1990). The Social Impact of the Chernobyl Disaster. New York: Macmillan.
 Medvedev, G. (1991). The Truth About Chernobyl. New York: Basic Books.
 Medvedev, Z. A. (1990). The Legacy of Chernobyl. New York: W. W. Norton & Co.
 Plokhy, S. (2018). Chernobyl: The History of a Nuclear Catastrophe. New York: Basic Books.
 Read, P. P. (1993). Ablaze: The Story of the Heroes and Victims of Chernobyl. New York: Random House.
 Tchertkoff, W. (2016). The Crime of Chernobyl: The Nuclear Gulag. London: Glagoslav Publications.

Cossacks

 O'Rourke, S. (2008). The Cossacks. Manchester: Manchester University Press.

Economics
 Koropeckyj, I. S. (Ed.). (1991). Ukrainian Economic History: Interpretive Essays (Illustrated edition) (Harvard Series In Ukrainian Studies). Cambridge: Harvard Ukrainian Research Institute.

Famine

 Andriewsky, O. (2015). "Towards a Decanted History: The Study of the Holodomor and Ukrainian Historiography". East/West: Journal of Ukrainian Studies, 2(1). 
 Applebaum, A. (2017). Red Famine: Stalin's War on Ukraine. New York: Doubleday.
 Bertelsen, O. (2017). Starvation and Violence amid the Soviet Politics of Silence, 1928–1929. Genocide Studies International, 11(1), 38–67.
 Bertelsen, O. (2018). “Hyphenated” Identities during the Holodomor: Women and Cannibalism. In E. Bemporad & J. W. Warren (Eds.), Women and Genocide: Survivors, Victims, Perpetrators (pp. 77–96). Bloomington: Indiana University Press.
 Boriak, H., Graziosi, A., Hajda, L. A., Kessler, G., Maksudov, S., Pianciola, N., & Grabowicz, G. G. (2009). Hunger by Design: The Great Ukrainian Famine and Its Soviet Context (H. Hryn, Ed.; Illustrated edition). Cambridge: Harvard Ukrainian Research Institute.
Davies, R. W., & Wheatcroft, S. G. (2009). The Years of Hunger: Soviet Agriculture, 1931–1933. London: Macmillan.
 Dolot, M. (1990). Execution by Hunger: The Hidden Holocaust. New York: W.W. Norton.
 Ellman, M. (2007). Stalin and the Soviet Famine of 1932-33 Revisited. Europe-Asia Studies, 59(4), 663–693.
 Gamache, R. (2020). Contextualizing FDR’s Campaign to Recognize the Soviet Union, 1932–1933: Propaganda, Famine Denial, and Ukrainian Resistance. Harvard Ukrainian Studies, 37(3/4), 287–322.
 Katchanovski, I. (2010). The Politics of Soviet and Nazi Genocides in Orange Ukraine. Europe-Asia Studies, 62(6), 973–997.
 Klid, B., &  Motyl, A. J. (Eds.). (2012). The Holodomor Reader: A Sourcebook on the Famine of 1932–1933 in Ukraine. Toronto: Canadian Institute of Ukrainian Studies Press.
 Makuch, A., Sysyn, F. (Eds.), Sysyn, F. (2015). Contextualizing the Holodomor: The impact of thirty years of Ukrainian famine studies. Edmonton & Toronto: Canadian Institute of Ukrainian Studies Press.
 Naimark, N. M. (2012). Stalin's Genocides. Princeton: Princeton University Press.
 (2004). Vernichtung durch Hunger: Der Holodomor in der Ukraine und der UdSSR (Extermination by hunger: the Holodomor in Ukraine and the USSR), special issue on the Holodomor of Osteuropa (Stuttgart), 54(12).

Gulag, ethnic cleansing and terror

 Hagenloh, P. (2009). Stalin's Police: Public Order and Mass Repression in the USSR, 1926–1941. Washington, D.C: Woodrow Wilson Center Press.
 Himka, J.-P. (2011). The Lviv Pogrom of 1941: The Germans, Ukrainian Nationalists, and the Carnival Crowd. Canadian Slavonic Papers / Revue Canadienne Des Slavistes, 53(2/4), 209–243.
 Kis, O. (2021). Survival as Victory: Ukrainian Women in the Gulag (L. Wolanskyj, Trans.) (Harvard Series in Ukrainian Studies). Cambridge: Harvard University Press.
 Martin, T. (1998). The Origins of Soviet Ethnic Cleansing. The Journal of Modern History, 70(4), 813–861.
 McBride, J. (2016). Peasants into Perpetrators: The OUN-UPA and the Ethnic Cleansing of Volhynia, 1943–1944. Slavic Review, 75(3), 630–654.
 Shearer, D. R. (2001). Social Disorder, Mass Repression, and the NKVD during the 1930S. Cahiers Du Monde Russe, 42(2/4), 505–534.
 Snyder, T. (1999). To Resolve the Ukrainian Problem Once and for All: The Ethnic Cleansing of Ukrainians in Poland, 1943–1947. Journal of Cold War Studies, 1(2), 86–120.
 Snyder, T. (2003). The Causes of Ukrainian-Polish Ethnic Cleansing 1943. past & Present, 179, 197–234.

Language
 Danylenko, A. (2017). The “Doubling of Hallelujah” for the “Bastard Tongue”: The Ukrainian Language Question in Russian Ukraine, 1905-1916. Harvard Ukrainian Studies, 35(1/4), 59–86.
 Remy, J. (2017). Against All Odds: Ukrainian in the Russian Empire in the Second Half of the Nineteenth Century. Harvard Ukrainian Studies, 35(1/4), 43–58.
 Shapoval, Y., & Olynyk, M. D. (2017). The Ukrainian Language under Totalitarianism and Total War. Harvard Ukrainian Studies, 35(1/4), 187–212.
 Shevelov, G. Y. (1989). The Ukrainian Language in the First Half of the Twentieth Century (Harvard Series In Ukrainian Studies). Cambridge: Harvard Ukrainian Research Institute.
 Yefimenko, H., & Olynyk, M. D. (2017). Bolshevik Language Policy as a Reflection of the Ideas and Practice of Communist Construction, 1919-1933. Harvard Ukrainian Studies, 35(1/4), 145–167.

Gender and family
 Bertelsen, O. (2018). “Hyphenated” Identities during the Holodomor: Women and Cannibalism. In E. Bemporad & J. W. Warren (Eds.), Women and Genocide: Survivors, Victims, Perpetrators (pp. 77–96). Bloomington: Indiana University Press.
 Fábián, K., & Korolczuk, E. (Eds.). (2017). Rebellious Parents: Parental Movements in Central-Eastern Europe and Russia. Indiana University Press.
 Kis, O. (2021). Survival as Victory: Ukrainian Women in the Gulag (L. Wolanskyj, Trans.). Cambridge: Harvard Ukrainian Research Institute.
 Tomiak, J. (1992). Education in the Baltic States, Ukraine, Belarus’ and Russia. Comparative Education, 28(1), 33–44.

Sexual orientation
 Under construction

Human rights
 Under construction

Nationalism
 Berkhoff, K. C., & Carynnyk, M. (1999). The Organization of Ukrainian Nationalists and Its Attitude toward Germans and Jews: Iaroslav Stets’Ko’s 1941 Zhyttiepys. Harvard Ukrainian Studies, 23(3/4), 149–184.
 Dornik, W. (Ed.). (2022). The Emergence of Ukraine: Self-Determination, Occupation, and War in Ukraine, 1917-1922. University of Alberta Press.
 Gomza, I. (2015). Elusive Proteus: A study in the ideological morphology of the Organization of Ukrainian Nationalists. Communist and Post-Communist Studies, 48(2/3), 195–207.
 Liber, G. O. (2016). The Ukrainian Movements in Poland, Romania, and Czechoslovakia, 1918–1939. In Total Wars and the Making of Modern Ukraine, 1914-1954 (pp. 81–108). University of Toronto Press.
 Markiewicz, P. (2021). Unlikely Allies: Nazi German and Ukrainian Nationalist Collaboration in the General Government During World War II. West Lafayette: Purdue University Press.
 Prizel, I. (2009). National Identity and Foreign Policy: Nationalism and Leadership in Poland, Russia and Ukraine (Cambridge Russian, Soviet and Post-Soviet Studies). Cambridge: Cambridge University Press.
 Rossoliński-Liebe, G. (2019). Inter-Fascist Conflicts in East Central Europe: The Nazis, the “Austrofascists,” the Iron Guard, and the Organization of Ukrainian Nationalists. In G. Rossoliński-Liebe & A. Bauerkämper (Eds.), Fascism without Borders: Transnational Connections and Cooperation between Movements and Regimes in Europe from 1918 to 1945 (1st ed., pp. 168–191). Berghahn Books.
 Shkandrij, M. (2015). Ukrainian Nationalism: Politics, Ideology, and Literature, 1929-1956. New Haven: Yale University Press.

Nuclear disarmament
 Kostenko, Y., & D’Anieri, P. (2021). Ukraine’s Nuclear Disarmament: A History (S. Krasynska, L. Wolanskyj, & O. Jennings, Trans.). Cambridge: Harvard Ukrainian Research Institute.

Orange Revolution
 Under construction

Religion and philosophy

 Bartal, I., & Polonsky, A. (Eds.). (1999). Polin: Studies in Polish Jewry Volume 12: Focusing on Galicia: Jews, Poles and Ukrainians 1772-1918. Liverpool: Liverpool University Press.
 Clucas, L. (Ed.). (1988). The Byzantine Legacy in Eastern Europe Boulder, CO: East European Monographs.
 Frick, D. (1995). Meletij Smotryc’kyj. Cambridge: Harvard University Press.
 Kivelson, V. A., & Worobec, C. D. (Eds.). (2020). Witchcraft in Russia and Ukraine, 1000–1900: A Sourcebook (NIU Series in Slavic, East European, and Eurasian Studies). DeKalb: Northern Illinois University Press.
 Gudziak, B. A. (2001). Crisis and Reform: The Kyivan Metropolitanate, the Patriarchate of Constantinople, and the Genesis of the Union of Brest (Harvard Series In Ukrainian Studies). Cambridge: Harvard Ukrainian Research Institute.
 Kulik, A. (2023). Jews in Old Rus´: A Documentary History (Harvard Series In Ukrainian Studies). Cambridge: Harvard Ukrainian Research Institute.
 Shepard, J. (2017). The Expansion of Orthodox Europe: Byzantium, the Balkans and Russia. London, UK: Routledge.
 Worobec, C. D. (1995). Witchcraft Beliefs and Practices in Prerevolutionary Russian and Ukrainian Villages. The Russian Review, 54(2), 165–187.

Rural and agricultural history
 Friesen, L. (2009). Rural Revolutions in Southern Ukraine: Peasants, Nobles, and Colonists, 1774-1905 (Harvard Series In Ukrainian Studies). Cambridge: Harvard Ukrainian Research Institute.

Urban and industrial history
 Amar, T. C. (2015). The Paradox of Ukrainian Lviv: A Borderland City between Stalinists, Nazis, and Nationalists. Ithaca: Cornell University Press.
 Bilenky, S. (2018). Imperial Urbanism in the Borderlands: Kyiv, 1800-1905 (Illustrated edition). Toronto: University of Toronto Press.
 Czaplicka, J. (Ed.). (2005). Lviv: A City in the Crosscurrents of Culture (Harvard Series In Ukrainian Studies). Cambridge: Harvard Ukrainian Research Institute.
 Herlihy, P. (1991). Odessa: A History, 1794–1914 (Harvard Series In Ukrainian Studies). Cambridge: Harvard Ukrainian Research Institute.
 Mick, C. (2011). Incompatible Experiences: Poles, Ukrainians and Jews in Lviv under Soviet and German Occupation, 1939-44. Journal of Contemporary History, 46(2), 336–363.
 Natan M. M. (2006). Jews, Ukrainians, and Russians in Kiev: Intergroup Relations in Late Imperial Associational Life. Slavic Review, 65(3), 475–501.
 Ther, P., & Czaplicka, J. (2000). War versus Peace: Interethnic Relations in Lviv during the First Half of the Twentieth Century. Harvard Ukrainian Studies, 24, 251–284

Biographies
 Erlacher, T. (2021). Ukrainian Nationalism in the Age of Extremes: An Intellectual Biography of Dmytro Dontsov (Harvard Series In Ukrainian Studies). Cambridge: Harvard Ukrainian Research Institute.
 Frick, D. (1995). Meletij Smotryc’kyj. Cambridge: Harvard University Press.
 Sysyn, F. (1985). Between Poland and the Ukraine: The Dilemma of Adam Kysil. Cambridge: Harvard University Press.

Volodymyr Zelenskyy

Works below should strictly follow the guidelines for this bibliography. To avoid abuse, works here should have independent English language academic reviews or reviews by major English language publications (e.g. New York Times, The Atlantic).
 Under constructionWorks by Volodymyr Zelenskyy War Speeches, Volodymyr Zelensky (7 book series), lmverlag Berlin.
 War Speeches I: February-March 2022 
 War Speeches II: April 2022 
 War Speeches III: May 2022
 War Speeches IV: June, 2022
 War Speeches V : July, 2022 
 War Speeches VI: August 2022 
 War Speeches VII: September 2022

Historiography, identity, and memory studies
Historiography
 Jilge, W. (2006). The Politics of History and the Second World War in Post-Communist Ukraine (1986/1991-2004/2005). Jahrbücher Für Geschichte Osteuropas, 54(1), 50–81.
 Kasianov, G., Ther, P. (Eds.). (2009). A Laboratory of Transnational History: Ukraine and Recent Ukrainian Historiography. Budapest and New York: Central European University Press. .
 Kasianov, G., Tolochko, O., & Olynyk, M. D. (2015). National Histories and Contemporary Historiography: The Challenges and Risks of Writing a New History of Ukraine. Harvard Ukrainian Studies, 34(1/4), 79–104.
 Miller, D. (1986). The Kievan Principality in the Century before the Mongol Invasion: An Inquiry into Recent Research and Interpretation. Harvard Ukrainian Studies, 10(1/2), 215–240.
 Plokhy, S. (2021). "Quo Vadis Ukrainian History?" The Frontline: Essays on Ukraine’s Past and Present (Harvard Series In Ukrainian Studies). Cambridge: Harvard Ukrainian Research Institute.
 Plokhy, S. (Ed.). (2016). The Future of the Past: New Perspectives on Ukrainian History. Cambridge MA: Harvard University Press. .
 Rudnytsky, I. (1963). "The Role of the Ukraine in Modern History". Slavic Review, 22(2), 199–216. .
 von Hagen, M. (1995). "Does Ukraine Have a History". Slavic Review, 54(3), 658–673. .
 Vushko, I. (2015). Empire, Nation, and In-Between: Ukrainian Historiography. Harvard Ukrainian Studies, 34(1/4), 297–311.
 Wolff, L. (2006). Revising Eastern Europe: Memory and the Nation in Recent Historiography. The Journal of Modern History, 78(1), 93–118.

Identity
 Burant, S. R. (1995). Foreign Policy and National Identity: A Comparison of Ukraine and Belarus. Europe-Asia Studies, 47(7), 1125–1144.
 Delwaide, J. (2011). Identity and Geopolitics: Ukraine’s Grappling with Imperial Legacies. Harvard Ukrainian Studies, 32/33, 179–207.
 Graziosi, A. (2015). Viewing the Twentieth Century through the Prism of Ukraine: Reflections on the Heuristic Potential of Ukrainian History. Harvard Ukrainian Studies, 34(1/4), 107–128.
 Khanenko-Friesen, N. (2015). Ukrainian Otherlands: Diaspora, Homeland, and Folk Imagination in the Twentieth Century (1st edition). Madison: University of Wisconsin Press.
 Kravchenko, V. (2015). Fighting Soviet Myths: The Ukrainian Experience. Harvard Ukrainian Studies, 34(1/4), 447–484.
 Prizel, I. (2009). National Identity and Foreign Policy: Nationalism and Leadership in Poland, Russia and Ukraine (Cambridge Russian, Soviet and Post-Soviet Studies). Cambridge: Cambridge University Press.

Memory studies
 Himka, J.-P. (2012). Ukrainian Memories of the Holocaust: The Destruction of Jews as Reflected in Memoirs Collected in 1947. Canadian Slavonic Papers / Revue Canadienne Des Slavistes, 54(3/4), 427–442.
 Jilge, W., & Troebst, S. (2006). Divided Historical Cultures? World War II and Historical Memory in Soviet and post-Soviet Ukraine: Introduction. Jahrbücher Für Geschichte Osteuropas, 54(1), 1–2.
 Perks, R. (1993). Ukraine’s Forbidden History: Memory and Nationalism. Oral History, 21(1), 43–53.
 Shevel, O. (2016). The Battle for Historical Memory in Postrevolutionary Ukraine. Current History, 115(783), 258–263.
 Wylegala, A., & Glowacka-Grajper, M. (2019). The Burden of the Past: History, Memory, and Identity in Contemporary Ukraine. Bloomington: Indiana University Press.

Other works
 Emeran, C. (2017). New Generation Political Activism in Ukraine: 2000–2014. London: Routledge.
 Hartley, J. M. (2021). The Volga: A History. New Haven: Yale University Press.
 Himka, J.P. (1983). Socialism in Galicia: The Emergence of Polish Social Democracy and Ukrainian Radicalism (Harvard Series In Ukrainian Studies). Cambridge: Harvard Ukrainian Research Institute.
 Kappeler, A., Kohut, Z. E., Sysyn, F. E., & von Hagen, M. (Eds.). (2003). Culture, nation, and identity: the Ukrainian-Russian encounter, 1600–1945. Toronto: Canadian Institute of Ukrainian Studies Press.
 Palko, O., & Ardeleanu, C. (Eds.). (2022). Making Ukraine: Negotiating, Contesting, and Drawing the Borders in the Twentieth Century.	Montreal: Mcgill-Queen’s University Press.
 Plokhy, S. (2021). The Frontline: Essays on Ukraine’s Past and Present (Harvard Series In Ukrainian Studies). Cambridge: Harvard Ukrainian Research Institute.
 Zavorotna, N. (2020). Scholars in Exile: The Ukrainian Intellectual World in Interwar Czechoslovakia. Toronto: University of Toronto Press.

Reference works
Early Slavs

Ukraine
 Encyclopedia of Ukraine (University of Toronto Press, 1984–1993) 5 vol; partial online version, from Canadian Institute of Ukrainian Studies

English language translations of primary sources
 Heifetz, E. (1921). The Slaughter of the Jews in the Ukraine in 1919. TextWorks by Volodymyr Zelenskyy' War Speeches, Volodymyr Zelensky (7 book series), lmverlag Berlin.
 War Speeches I: February-March 2022 
 War Speeches II: April 2022 
 War Speeches III: May 2022
 War Speeches IV: June, 2022
 War Speeches V : July, 2022 
 War Speeches VI: August 2022 
 War Speeches VII: September 2022

Academic journals

Bibliographies
Books
Below are recent works from mainstream and academic publishers which contain bibliographies of Ukrainian history.
 Further Reading appendix in Plokhy, S. (2015). The Gates of Europe: A History of Ukraine. New York: Basic Books.
Online
Below are online bibliographies of Ukrainian history from historical associations and academic institutions.
 Berkhoff, K. C. (1997). Ukraine under Nazi Rule (1941-1944): Sources and Finding Aids: Part I. Jahrbücher Für Geschichte Osteuropas, 45(1), 85–103.
 ———. (1997). Ukraine under Nazi Rule (1941-1944): Sources and Finding Aids Part II. Jahrbücher Für Geschichte Osteuropas, 45(2), 273–309.
Primary sources
 Boriak, H. (2001). The Publication of Sources on the History of the 1932–1933 Famine-Genocide: History, Current State, and Prospects. Harvard Ukrainian Studies, 25(3/4), 167–186.
 Dalrymple, D. G. (1965). The Soviet Famine of 1932-1934; Some Further References. Soviet Studies, 16''(4), 471–474.

See also
 Outline of Ukraine
 Bibliography of the history of the Early Slavs and Rus'
 Bibliography of Russian history (1223–1613)
 Bibliography of Russian history (1613–1917)
 Bibliography of the Russian Revolution and Civil War
 Bibliography of Stalinism and the Soviet Union
 Bibliography of the Soviet Union during World War II
 Bibliography of the Post Stalinist Soviet Union
 Bibliography of the history of Poland

References

Notes

Citations

External links
 Under Construction

Ukrainian history
Ukraine
Bibliography